Dorin Degan (born 11 July 1959) is a Romanian bobsledder. He competed at the 1984 Winter Olympics and the 1988 Winter Olympics.

References

1959 births
Living people
Romanian male bobsledders
Olympic bobsledders of Romania
Bobsledders at the 1984 Winter Olympics
Bobsledders at the 1988 Winter Olympics
Sportspeople from Brașov